Sheikh Fazlul Karim Selim (born 2 February  1949; better known as Sheikh Selim) is a Bangladeshi politician who is a Jatiya Sangsad member representing the Gopalganj-2 constituency since 1991. He is a member of the standing committee of Bangladesh Awami League party. He also served as the minister of Health and Family Welfare during 1999–2001.

Early life 
Selim is the nephew of Sheikh Mujibur Rahman, former president of Bangladesh. He is the younger brother of Sheikh Fazlul Haque Mani founder of Jubo League. He is a cousin of the current Prime Minister Sheikh Hasina.

Career 
Salim is the current parliamentary representative for the a constituency of Gopalganj-2. He is a Presidium member of Bangladesh Awami League. He has won parliamentary elections from Gopalganj-2 seven times. He served as the Minister for Health and Family Welfare in the First Sheikh Hasina Cabinet. He is the Chairman of the Parliamentary Standing Committee on Health and Family Welfare Ministry.

Controversy 
On 23 April 2008, Bangladesh Anti Corruption Commission sued him for corruption at the Ramna Police Station. He secured bail from the High Court on 16 September 2008. The High Court, in September, stayed proceeding of the case against Selim. On 24 October 2010, Supreme Court stayed the High Court order, allowing the case to proceed.

Personal life 
Selim's eldest son Sheikh Fazle Fahim is the current president of the Federation of Bangladesh Chambers of Commerce & Industries and is married to a daughter of businessman Moosa Bin Shamsher. Another son Sheikh Nayem is married to the daughter of BNP politician Iqbal Hasan Mahmud Tuku. One of Selim's grandsons, Zayan Chowdhary, died in the 2019 Sri Lanka Easter bombings. The child's father Moshiul Haque Chowdhary was wounded, though his mother, Selim's daughter, Sheikh Amina Sultana Sonia, was unharmed.

References

Living people
1947 births
People from Gopalganj District, Bangladesh
Awami League politicians
Sheikh Mujibur Rahman family
3rd Jatiya Sangsad members
5th Jatiya Sangsad members
7th Jatiya Sangsad members
8th Jatiya Sangsad members
9th Jatiya Sangsad members
10th Jatiya Sangsad members
11th Jatiya Sangsad members
Health and Family Welfare ministers of Bangladesh